In physics, quantum dynamics is the quantum version of classical dynamics. Quantum dynamics deals with the motions, and energy and momentum exchanges of systems whose behavior is governed by the laws of quantum mechanics. Quantum dynamics is relevant for burgeoning fields, such as quantum computing and atomic optics.

In mathematics, quantum dynamics is the study of the mathematics behind quantum mechanics. Specifically, as a study of dynamics, this field investigates how quantum mechanical observables change over time. Most fundamentally, this involves the study of one-parameter automorphisms of the algebra of all bounded operators on the Hilbert space of observables (which are self-adjoint operators). These dynamics were understood as early as the 1930s, after Wigner, Stone, Hahn and Hellinger worked in the field. Recently, mathematicians in the field have studied irreversible quantum mechanical systems on von Neumann algebras.

See also 
Quantum Field Theory
Perturbation theory
Semigroups
Pseudodifferential operators
Brownian motion
Dilation theory
Quantum probability
Free probability

References 

Quantum mechanics